The 77th Brigade is a British Army formation, created in January 2015 by renaming the Security Assistance Group which was created under the Army 2020 concept. It is based at Denison Barracks in Hermitage, Berkshire and became operational in April 2015.

The brigade was named the 77th in tribute to the 77th Indian Infantry Brigade, which was part of the Chindits, an Indian Army guerilla warfare force led by Orde Wingate who used unorthodox tactics against the Japanese in Burma in World War II. The formation badge of the revived 77th shows a mythical Burmese creature known as a Chinthe in reference to the Chindits.

History 
The first 77th Brigade was raised as part of the new army also known as Kitchener's Army and assigned to the 26th Division and served on the Western Front and the Macedonian Front during the First World War. Some of the past units include:

 8th Battalion, Royal Scots Fusiliers
 11th Battalion, Cameronians (Scottish Rifles)
 10th Battalion, Black Watch
 12th Battalion, Argyll and Sutherland Highlanders
 77th Machine Gun Company
 77th SAA Section Ammunition Column
 77th Trench Mortar Battery

Role and composition
The Security Assistance Group (SAG)'s mission was to work with cross-Whitehall agencies to achieve the goals of Defence Engagement and Building Stability Overseas Strategies. 77th Brigade was created to draw together a host of existing and developing capabilities essential to meet the challenges of modern conflict and warfare,  the unit's objectives will be similar to that of the SAG. Specifically, it is to:

Wired described the brigade as a "psychological operations unit responsible for 'non-lethal' warfare that reportedly uses social media to "control the narrative", as well as disseminating UK government-friendly podcasts and videos".

Warfare Today says of the brigade that it is a combined regular army and reserve unit "for non-lethal warfare and behavioural influence", based at Denison Barracks, Hermitage, Berkshire.

The SAG aimed to have a full strength of 453 military and civilian personnel and occasionally, personnel from the Foreign and Commonwealth Office, Department for International Development and the Stabilisation Unit may be attached to the Brigade or work with it, of this total there will be 440 military posts in the brigade with up to 42% of these being reservists. A December 2016 response to a freedom of information request stated that the liability (Table of Organisation) of the brigade included 182 regular and 266 reserve posts but the existing strength was  only 153 regular and 123 reserve.

Structure

Current structure
 Brigade Headquarters, at Denison Barracks, Hermitage
 Task Group
 Division Information Activity and Outreach Cell
 Brigade Information Activity and Outreach Cell
 Information Activity and Outreach Teams
 Information Warfare Team
 Tactical Engagement Team
 Information Activity Training and Advisory Team
 Digital Operations Group
 Web Operations Team
 Production Team
 Operational Media and Communications Group
 Outreach Group
 The Staff Corps
 Defence Cultural Specialist Unit
 Cultural Property Protection Unit (Army Reserve)

Previous structure

Initially designated as the Security Assistance Group, the formation included the following units:
 Headquarters Element
 Media Operations Group (Volunteers) (MOG) - Media Operations
 Security Capacity Building Team (SCBT) - Military Capacity Building
 15 Psychological Operations Group (15 POG) - Psychological Warfare
 Military Stabilisation Support Group (MSSG) - Stabilisation and Conflict Prevention.  The Group was tasked with civil-military work in conflict zones or unstable areas. It was a hybrid unit consisting of both regular and reserve soldiers of all branches of the British armed forces. Under the Army 2020 concept, the MSSG has been placed under the command of the 77th Brigade. The MSSG was led by a colonel and had three detachments and a specialist detachment, each led by a lieutenant colonel. It used to be under the Royal Engineers. It has worked in many UK operations most notably Afghanistan, where it won an award for humanitarian work and helped to win over the population's minds from the Taliban. The MSSG has also helped with conflict prevention in Uganda, Sierra Leone and the Philippines.

In July 2015 and October 2015, the headquarters and four subordinate elements were reshaped into six 'Columns'.

 No.1 Column - Planning support focusing on the behavioural analysis of actors, audiences and adversaries
 No.2 Column - Provided reachback support to deployed operations
 No.3 Column - Provided deployable specialists to other parts of the Armed Forces and other Government organisations
 No.4 Column - Provided professional specialists in Security Capacity Building
 No.5 Column - Media operations and Civil Affairs
 No.7 Column - Engineer and Logistic Staff Corps (Structure formed in October 2015)

There was no No. 6 Column for historical reasons.

Future Structure
From 2022 under the Future Soldier programme the structure of the brigade became:

 Brigade Headquarters at Pirbright
 The Staff Corps
 Deployed Information Activity
 Stand-off Information Activity
 Honourable Artillery Company
 6 Military Intelligence Battalion, Intelligence Corps

Activities
The Brigade participated in a two-week disaster relief exercise in Bosnia and Herzegovina. It deployed to the Philippines in April 2015 to assist the Philippines Government in developing their contingency plans for natural disasters. 77th Brigade has formed a formal partnership with the 361st Civil Affairs Brigade, US Army Europe.

The Brigade uses social media such as Twitter and Facebook as well as psyop techniques to influence populations and behaviour. David Miller, a professor of political sociology at the University of Bristol who studies British government propaganda and public relations, said that it is "involved in manipulation of the media including using fake online profiles".

In September 2019, Middle East Eye reported that Gordon MacMillan, a Twitter executive with editorial control over the Middle East and North Africa, is also a reservist officer in the 77th Brigade. Both Twitter and the British Army denied that they have a relationship or agreement. Miller said it was hypocritical of Twitter to close accounts alleged to be connected with non-Western governments while having links to the British Army.

On 22 April 2020, during the UK government's daily coronavirus briefing, General Nick Carter confirmed that 77th Brigade are working with the Home Office Rapid Response Unit "helping to quash rumours from misinformation, but also to counter disinformation".

On 7 May 2020, The Economist interviewed Carter on the role of 77th Brigade in fighting COVID-19 pandemic disinformation. The Defence Cultural Specialist Unit was used to monitor the internet for content on COVID-19 and to look for evidence of disinformation related to COVID-19 vaccines. An army source later told the Mail on Sunday that this involved monitoring of the UK population. A government spokesman stated in response "These units used publicly available data, including material shared on social media platforms, to assess UK disinformation trends and narratives. They did not target individuals or take any action that could impact anyone’s ability to discuss and debate issues freely."

Future 
Under the Future Soldier programme, the brigade will move to Pirbright Camp in Surrey in 2026.

See also
Joint Forces Cyber Group
Joint Threat Research Intelligence Group
1st Information Operations Command (Land)
Land Information Assurance Group
Psychological warfare
State-sponsored Internet propaganda
Mass surveillance

References

External links
77th Brigade
British Army journal, 'British Army Review', Winter-Spring 2020, pages 14-19

Brigades of the British Army
Military advisory groups
Infantry brigades of the British Army
Infantry brigades of the British Army in World War I
Infantry brigades of the British Army in World War II
Army 2020
Military units and formations established in 2014
Organisations based in Berkshire
Psychological warfare
West Berkshire District
2014 establishments in the United Kingdom